Tetramorium tonganum, is a species of ant in the subfamily Myrmicinae. It is found in Australasian, Indo-Australian, Oriental, and Palaearctic regional countries.

References

External links

 at antwiki.org
Animaldiversity.org
Itis.org
AntKey.org

tonganum
Hymenoptera of Asia
Insects described in 1970